The Rapid Response to Population Movements (RRMP) [French: Réponse rapide aux movements de populations] is a humanitarian inter-agency mechanism in the Democratic Republic of Congo (DRC).

Co-led by UNICEF and OCHA, the mechanism enables humanitarian actors to respond, subject to certain criteria, to the humanitarian needs of those affected by population movements, including internally displaced persons (IDPs) and former IDPs, as well as host communities.  The mechanism includes phases of contingency preparation, surveillance, and response.

External links
 OCHA, Note recapitulative sur le RRMP, 8 July 2010
 OCHA, D.R. Congo: 20,000 Newly Displaced in North Kivu due to Conflict with ADF, 13 July 2010

Social welfare charities based in the Democratic Republic of the Congo